Ənvər Məmmədxanlı may refer to:
Ənvər Məmmədxanlı (writer)
Ənvər Məmmədxanlı, Azerbaijan